Vlajković is a Serbian surname. It may refer to:

Svetozar Vlajković, Serbian writer
Radovan Vlajković, Yugoslav politician
Sava Vlajković, Serbian politician
Slavoljub Vlajković, Yugoslav politician

See also
Vlatković (disambiguation)

Serbian surnames